A number of Yiddish symbols have emerged to represent the language and the Yiddishist movement over history. Lacking a central authority, however, they have not had the prominence of those of the Hebrew revival and the Zionist  symbols of Israel. Several of the Yiddish symbols are drawn from Yiddish songs in the klezmer tradition.

"Di Goldene Pave" popularized the symbol of the golden peacock, and "Raisins and Almonds" that of a goat, echoing that in Chad Gadya. The golden peacock has been a subject of Yiddish poetry, including a collection under that title from Moyshe-Leyb Halpern. Yiddishpiel uses a logo of golden peacock plumage surrounding its theatre building. The Forward has used gold in its masthead (also recalling Di Goldene Medine) since 2015, and the Yiddish Book Center has used a golden goat since 2012, designed by Alexander Isley with lettering from El Lissitzky's lithographs of Chad Gadya.

"Oyfn Pripetshik" highlights komets-alef as a distinctive letter in Yiddish orthography, in a play on a Yiddish alphabet song. This particular letter is also used to represent Yiddish on Duolingo, replacing a "Yiddish flag" on the pattern of the flag of Israel but in black with a menorah, promoted by a user from Wikimedia Commons which was used for a time in the Duolingo Incubator.

Flags
There is no historical language or ethnic flag for Yiddish speakers, though in the 21st century there have been a couple of minor proposals for digital use as flag icons for languages.

Flag with a menorah 
It appeared on the internet around 2012, when it was published on Wikipedia. Rapidly, it disseminated in the internet, becoming number one result in any google search for “Yiddish flag”. Soon after, Duolingo, a vocabulary learning app, started using it for promoting its Yiddish course. Following the publication of the article "What Flag Should Yiddish Fly?", that criticized the flag for its gloomy appearance and resemblance to the flag of Israel (which was considered inappropriate due to an unfavorable policy towards Yiddish in Israel's early years), Duolingo changed it to the komets alef. Despite criticism, the flag remains popular. The claims that the flag originated in anarchist milieu in the early 20th century is not true.

See also
Yiddishkeit
Esperanto symbols

References

Jewish symbols
Lists of symbols
Yiddish